Stilts may refer to:
 Stilts, leg-attached poles serving to increase one's height
 Stilts (architecture), poles, posts or pillars used to allow a structure or building to stand at a distance above the ground.
 Stilt, a wading bird of the genus Himantopus or Cladorhynchus in the family Recurvirostridae
 Stilt (journal), the ornithological journal of the Australasian Wader Studies Group
 "Stilts" (Malcolm in the Middle), the 20th episode of the 6th season of Malcolm in the Middle
 Stilts of Stilt house or pilotis
 Stilt (ceramics) small supports used when firing glazed ceramics to separate them